Point Retreat is a point at the east extremity of the Kar Plateau, in Granite Harbour, Victoria Land. It was named by the British Antarctic Expedition, 1910–13.
 

Headlands of Victoria Land
Scott Coast